Hastings High School may refer to:

Hastings High School (Florida) — Hastings, Florida
Hastings High School (Michigan) — Hastings, Michigan
Hastings High School (Minnesota) — Hastings, Minnesota
Hastings Senior High School (Nebraska) — Hastings, Nebraska
Hastings High School (New York) — Hastings-on-Hudson, New York
Alief Hastings High School — Houston, Texas
Hastings High School (British Columbia) — Coquitlam, British Columbia Canada
Hastings Boys' High School — Hastings, New Zealand